C.L. McCormick (December 1, 1919 – March 1, 1987) was an American politician and businessman.

McCormick was born in McCormick, Pope County, Illinois. He went to the Vienna, Illinois public schools. He served in the United States Army during World War II. He owned a taxi, merchandise, and restaurant business in Vienna, Illinois. In 1941, he served on the Vienna City Council and was a Republican. He served in the Illinois House of Representatives from 1957 to 1973 and from 1981 to 1983. In the 1982 general election, he ran for the Illinois Senate losing to Democratic incumbent Gene Johns. He died at Massac Hospital in Metropolis, Illinois.

Notes

1919 births
1987 deaths
People from Pope County, Illinois
People from Vienna, Illinois
Military personnel from Illinois
Businesspeople from Illinois
Illinois city council members
Republican Party members of the Illinois House of Representatives
20th-century American politicians
United States Army personnel of World War II
20th-century American businesspeople